Leka Tuungafasi is a Tongan rugby union player. His position is prop. He is the brother of Ofa Tuungafasi.

In June 2021 he signed for Northland.

Reference list

External links
itsrugby.co.uk profile

Tongan rugby union players
Living people
Rugby union props
Northland rugby union players
Year of birth missing (living people)